François Pidou de Saint Olon (1640, Touraine - 1720, Paris) was a French diplomat under Louis XIV.

Embassy to Genoa and Spain
In 1682, he was nominated as the first French resident envoy to the Republic of Genoa. He was then sent as an envoy to Madrid.

Embassy to Morocco

in 1689, Pidou de Saint Olon was then nominated as ambassador to the court of the Moroccan ruler Mulay Ismail, in view of the signature of a commercial treaty. This responded to the Embassy of Mohammad Temim to Louis XIV in 1682. In 1690, Pidou de Saint Olon was in the city of Salé, where he visited the French Consul Jean-Baptiste Estelle.

His mission did not succeed however, and he only remained 2–3 weeks in Morocco. He wrote an account of his visit to Morocco, Relation de l'empire de Maroc ("The present state of the Empire of Morocco").

Another Moroccan ambassador Abdallah bin Aisha would visit France in 1699-1700.

François Pidou de Saint Olon died in Paris on 27 September 1720.

See also
 France-Morocco relations

Works
 Estat présent de l'empire de Maroc, 1694
 Relation de l'empire de Maroc, 1695

Notes

17th-century French diplomats
Ambassadors of France to Morocco
17th century in Morocco
17th-century French writers
17th-century French male writers
Ambassadors to the Republic of Genoa
1640 births
1720 deaths